The Hundred of Wallaroo is a cadastral unit of hundred located on the Copper Coast of South Australia. It is one of the 16 hundreds of the County of Daly. It was named in 1862 by Governor Dominick Daly after the indigenous term wadla warru presumed to mean wallaby urine.

Locations

The most densely populated town and localities of the Copper Coast council are situated inside (or largely inside) the bounds of the Hundred of Wallaroo:
 Wallaroo and North Beach
 Kadina (western half) and its suburbs: New Town, Jericho, Wallaroo Mines, Matta Flat and Jerusalem
 Moonta and its suburbs: Moonta Bay, North Moonta, Paramatta, Cross Roads, North Yelta, Yelta, Moonta Mines, East Moonta, Hamley, Port Hughes and Kooroona
 Rural localities of Wallaroo Plain (west portion), Warburto and Boors Plain (larger west portion)

Local government
 Corporate Town of Kadina (1872-1977)
 Corporate Town of Moonta (1872-1984)
 Corporate Town of Wallaroo (1874-1997)
 District Council of Kadina (1888-1984)
 District Council of Northern Yorke Peninsula (1984-1997)
 District Council of the Copper Coast (1997-)

See also
Lands administrative divisions of South Australia

References

Wallaroo